NorKam Senior Secondary School is a public high school in Kamloops, British Columbia, Canada. It is a part of School District 73 Kamloops/Thompson. NorKam is a senior high school as it includes grades 10–12.

At NorKam Senior Secondary there are language programs: French, Spanish, Italian, Japanese and English. The school offers the  International Baccalaureate Diploma program. As well as the newly implemented tradeswing, where students can take either a carpentry or mechanics sampler for a semester. Norkam is also partnered with the local university, Thompson Rivers University to allow students to go to TRU for a semester with the TRUStart program. Norkam has a hairdressing course and a fully functioning industrial kitchen.

NorKam offers band and choir as well as drama, carpentry, and mechanics as some of their electives.

Sports 
The NorKam girls rugby team won the 2016 BC Provincial Tier 2 championship. The tournament was held in Kamloops from May 26–28, 2016.

References

High schools in British Columbia
High schools in Kamloops
Educational institutions established in 1967
1967 establishments in British Columbia